The Marromeu Game Reserve is a protected swath of  of floodplain in the Zambezi, the only such area along the river. It was dedicated on 1 January 1969.  It is located near Beira.

The area is an open grassland with many rivers and streams in the Zambezi delta. It supports highest density of water birds in Mozambique.

Access  
By road from Beira.

Climate change

In 2022, the IPCC Sixth Assessment Report included Marromeu Game Reserve in the list of African natural heritage sites which would be threatened by flooding and coastal erosion by the end of the century, but only if climate change followed RCP 8.5, which is the scenario of high and continually increasing greenhouse gas emissions associated with the warming of over 4°C., and is no longer considered very likely. The other, more plausible scenarios result in lower warming levels and consequently lower sea level rise: yet, sea levels would continue to increase for about 10,000 years under all of them.  Even if the warming is limited to 1.5°C, global sea level rise is still expected to exceed  after 2000 years (and higher warming levels will see larger increases by then), consequently exceeding 2100 levels of sea level rise under RCP 8.5 (~ with a range of ) well before the year 4000.

References

Floodplains of Africa
Zambezi basin
Geography of Sofala Province
Protected areas established in 1969
Parks in Mozambique
Tourist attractions in Sofala Province

pt:Reserva de Marromeu